IK or Ik may refer to:

Businesses and organizations
 IK Investment Partners, a European private equity firm
 Imair Airlines (IATA code IK)
 Iparretarrak, a Basque nationalist organization

Languages
 Ik language (ISO 639 alpha-3 ikx), spoken by the Ik people of Uganda
 Inupiaq language (ISO 639 alpha-2), a group of dialects of the Inuit language, spoken in Alaska

Places
 Ik (river), a tributary of the Kama in Bashkortostan and Tatarstan, Russia
 Ik (Berd), a tributary of the Berd in Novosibirsk Oblast, Russia
 Bolshoy Ik, a tributary of the Sakmara in Bashkortostan and Orenburg Oblast, Russia
 Ilm-Kreis, a region in Germany

Science and technology
 IK (gene), a protein-encoding gene
 IK code, a classification of resistance to mechanical impacts 
 Internationale Kerze (German for "international candle"), an old photometric unit to measure luminous intensity
 Inverse kinematics, a branch of mechanics

Other uses
 Ik Onkar, a symbol used in the Sikh religion
 Ik people of Uganda
 The Ik, a 1975 play by Colin Higgins and Denis Cannan
 Imran Khan, Pakistani politician and former cricketer
 Index Kewensis, a publication maintained by the Royal Botanic Gardens, Kew
 Indigenous knowledge, traditional knowledge held by indigenous peoples
 International Karate, a computer game